Malaysians are citizens who are identified with the country of Malaysia. Although citizens make up the majority of Malaysians, non-citizen residents and overseas Malaysians may also claim a Malaysian identity.

The country is home to people of various national, ethnic and religious origins. As a result, many Malaysians do not equate their nationality with ethnicity, but with citizenship and allegiance to Malaysia. Majority of the population, however, belong to several clearly defined racial groups within the country with their own distinct cultures and traditions: Malays, Orang Asli (aboriginal population), Malaysian Chinese (primarily Han Chinese), Malaysian Indians (primarily Tamils). The majority of the non-Malay and non-aboriginal population in modern Malaysia is made up of immigrants and their descendants. Following the initial period of Portuguese, Dutch and then significantly longer British colonisation, different waves (or peaks) of immigration and settlement of non-aboriginal peoples took place over the course of nearly five centuries and continue today.

Malayan independence from the United Kingdom in 1957 grew gradually over the course of latter part of the 20th century since the formation of the Federation of Malaya in 1948 (excluding Crown Colony of Singapore, Crown Colony of North Borneo and Crown Colony of Sarawak). World War II in particular gave rise to a desire amongst Malayans to have their country recognised as a fully-fledged sovereign state with a distinct citizenship.

Population

As of 2010, Malaysians make up 0.4% of the world's total population, having relied upon immigration for population growth and social development. Approximately 30% of current Malaysians are first- or second-generation immigrants, and 20 percent of Malaysian residents in the 2000s were not born in Malaysian soil. It is estimated, by 2031, nearly one-half of Malaysians above the age of 15 will be foreign born or have one foreign born parent. Bumiputera, according to the 2010 Malaysian Census, numbered at 17,523,508 or 61.85% of the country's 28,334,135 population.

Citizenship and diaspora

The Malaysian diaspora has a population of 1,730,152 in 2019, according to the United Nations Department of Economic and Social Affairs. Malaysia does not keep track of emigration and counts of Malaysians abroad are thus only available courtesy of statistics kept by the destination countries. The diaspora includes both descendants of early emigrants from Malaysia, as well as more recent emigrants from Malaysia. 

Since independence, a total of 688,766 naturalised foreigners had been granted Malaysian citizenship while 10,828 individuals had their citizenships revoked. The community of Malaysians in Australian external territory of Christmas Island makes up the majority of the population, while Singapore has the largest minority community of Malaysians, with 952,261 people, followed by Australia, the United Kingdom and the United States.

Ethnic groups and citizenship

Classification of 2010 Census ethnic group is as set by Inter-Agency Technical Committee (IATC) in Appendix 1. IATC is a committee formed to co-ordinate and monitor the implementation and use of standardised codes, classifications and definitions used by the Department of Statistics, Malaysia and other government agencies. For the purpose of tabulation and analysis, as well as taking into account the diverse ethnic group in Peninsular Malaysia, Sabah, Federal Territory of Labuan and Sarawak, major ethnic groups according to region as follows:

Information collected in the census including ethnic group and citizenship was based on respondent's answer and did not refer to any official document.

Information on citizenship should be used with caution as it is subject to content and coverage errors especially for non-citizens as in censuses in most countries.

Culture

Language

Malaysia contains speakers of 137 living languages, 41 of which are found in Peninsula Malaysia. Malaysian, or Standard Malay, is the official language, while English is considered the de facto language for business. The Bumiputeras speak various Austronesian and Austroasiatic languages as well as smaller language families such as Tai-Kadai and Creoles. Chinese Malaysians predominantly speak varieties of Chinese from the southern provinces of China. The more common varieties in the country are Cantonese, Mandarin, Hokkien, Hakka, Teochew, Hainanese, and Fuzhou. Tamil is the predominant among Indian Malaysians, though languages like Telugu, Malayalam and Punjabi are also spoken.

Religion

The Malaysian constitution guarantees freedom of religion while making Islam the state religion. According to the Population and Housing Census 2010 figures, ethnicity and religious beliefs correlate highly. Approximately 61.3% of the population practice Islam, 19.8% practice Buddhism, 9.2% Christianity, 6.3% Hinduism and 1.3% practice Confucianism, Taoism and other traditional Chinese religions. 0.7% declared no religion and the remaining 1.4% practised other religions or did not provide any information.

References

Further reading